MV Waimarama was a UK refrigerated cargo liner. She was built in Northern Ireland for Shaw, Savill & Albion Line and launched in 1938. She carried perishable foods, particularly meat, from New Zealand to the United Kingdom.

Waimarama took part in Operation Pedestal in August 1942. A German aircraft bombed her before the convoy reached Malta. The ship exploded and sank with the loss of 83 of her crew.

Precursors
Shaw, Savill and Albion ran passenger and cargo services between New Zealand and the UK via the Panama Canal. In the mid-1930s Harland and Wolff built for Shaw, Savill three of the swiftest cargo liners in the World: the refrigerated ships Waiwera launched in 1934, Waipawa launched a month later and Wairangi launched in 1935.

They had a long accommodation block amidships that included not only their passengers' and officers' cabins but also quarters for their crew.

This made them as fast as many intermediate ocean liners of the time, and put them among the swiftest cargo liners in the World.

Building Waimarama
Waimarama was a development of this successful design. Harland and Wolff designed her to the same dimensions as her three sisters, but with more powerful engines.

For her 12 passengers Waimarama had eight single and two double cabins, a dining saloon, a smoke-room and a lounge. Crew quarters were amidships in two-berth cabins.

Harland and Wolff launched Waimarama on 31 May 1938 and completed her on 6 October that year. She had two screws, each driven by a six-cylinder two-stroke double-acting Burmeister and Wain diesel engine. Between them the two engines developed a total of 2,463 NHP. On her sea trials she achieved , which was exceptionally fast for a cargo liner.

Second World War
In the Second World War Waimarama seems to have voyaged mostly unescorted. The only convoys in which she is recorded are Convoy WS 5B from Liverpool to Freetown in Sierra Leone in February and March 1941 and a few convoys in summer 1942.

On 5 June 1942 Waimarama left Cristóbal at the Caribbean entrance of the Panama Canal in Convoy CS 5, which took her as far as Key West in Florida. There she joined Convoy KN 109 which took her up the east coast of the US as far as Hampton Roads between North Carolina and Virginia. On 23 June she left New York and crossed the North Atlantic unescorted to Liverpool, where she arrived on 4 July.

Operation Pedestal

In the war Waimarama had been converted into a defensively equipped merchant ship (DEMS). For a cargo ship that typically meant one 4-inch or 4.7-inch naval gun on the stern, a small number of machine guns for anti-aircraft cover and, on larger cargo ships such as Waimarama, possibly a 3-inch anti-aircraft gun as well.

However, in July 1942 ships selected for Operation Pedestal had their armament increased by the addition of either Oerlikon 20 mm cannons and/or Bofors 40 mm guns. Both Waimarama and her sister Wairangi were selected for Operation Pedestal. In July 1942 they would therefore have been fitted with extra anti-aircraft guns.

On 2 August 1942, 14 Allied merchant ships including Waimarama and Wairangi left the Firth of Clyde in Scotland in the heavily escorted Convoy WS 12S. On 10 August they reached Gibraltar where they became Convoy MW 12. From 11 August onward German and Italian aircraft, surface vessels and submarines repeatedly attacked the convoy.

Loss
Before dawn in the small hours of 13 August, Italian torpedo boats and German E-boats sank four merchant ships including Wairangi. Then at 0810 hrs Luftwaffe aircraft attacked the convoy east of Cape Bon, Tunisia and south of the Italian island of Pantelleria. A Junkers Ju 88 aircraft dropped a stick of bombs, three or four of which hit Waimarama. Waimaramas cargo included ammunition and her deck cargo included containers of aviation spirit. Within minutes she "blew up with a roar and a sheet of flame with clouds of billowing smoke". Burning fuel also covered the surface of the sea. 83 of Waimaramas complement were killed, including her Master.

Waimaramas crew had no time to launch any of her lifeboats. But some of her complement were blown into the water, and despite burning oil on the surface some of them survived. They included a 17-year-old cadet, Frederick Treves, who was on his first voyage, and an officer who could not swim. Treves kept the officer's head above water and then found a piece of wood which he gave to the officer to cling to, thereby saving his life.

Burning débris showered the Blue Star liner , which was following immediately astern of Waimarama. The fire and smoke were so intense that many of the crew on the after part of Melbourne Star assumed she too had been hit. Despite the fuel burning on the surface of the sea, 36 of them jumped overboard.

The destroyer  entered the field of burning débris and, at considerable risk to herself, rescued survivors of both ships from the water. Some sources state that only 22 men who jumped from Melbourne Star and two men who were blown overboard from Waimarama survived, while others  state that Ledbury succeeded in rescuing 18 survivors from Waimarama and 24 from Melbourne Star.

By 0930 hrs Ledbury had completed rescuing survivors. She landed them on Malta on 15 August.

Aftermath
The Shipwrecked Mariners Society granted each survivor from Waimarama £76 10s relief.

In February 1943 Waimaramas Master, Robert Pearce, DSC, and his Third Wireless Officer, John Jackson, were mentioned in dispatches "For gallantry, skill and resolution while an important Convoy was fought through to Malta in the face of relentless attacks by day and night from enemy aircraft, submarines and surface forces". Captain Pearce's award was posthumous.

Cadet Treves was awarded the BEM and Lloyd's War Medal for Bravery at Sea for saving the officer who could not swim.

On 10 August 2012, the 70th anniversary of Convoy MW 12's departure from Gibraltar, MaltaPost issued a 26 cent commemorative stamp bearing  a picture of Waimarama under way at sea. It is one of a set of 26 cent stamps issued that day, which between them commemorate every ship that took part in the convoy.

References

Bibliography

External links
 – photograph of Waimarama

1938 ships
Maritime incidents in August 1942
Merchant ships sunk by aircraft
Ships built in Belfast
Ships built by Harland and Wolff
Ships of the Shaw, Savill & Albion Line
Ships sunk by German aircraft
World War II merchant ships of the United Kingdom
World War II shipwrecks in the Mediterranean Sea